Grégoire Colin (born 25 July 1975) is a French actor.

Career
Grégoire started acting on the French stage at age 12. He first caught the eye of critics in the 1992 Agnieszka Holland's psychological family drama Olivier, Olivier when he was just 17. He co-starred in Adela (2000), Beau travail (1999) and the Macedonian film Before the Rain (1994), among many others. Colin is set for the lead role in the French thriller film Proie.

In 1998, he participated in the internationally celebrated La Vie Rêvée Des Anges, better known to international audiences as The Dreamlife of Angels, in which he played a ruthless club owner. In 2009, Colin's first short film La Baie Du Renard was screened at the Cannes Film Festival. In 2009, he started his own production company Tsilaosa Films.

Grégoire won the Best Actor Award at the Locarno International Film Festival for his role in the film Nénette et Boni.

Filmography

As actor
 1990 : Le Silence d'ailleurs (dir. Guy Mouyal)
 1991 : L'Année de l'éveil (dir. Gérard Corbiau)
 1992 : Olivier, Olivier (dir. Agnieszka Holland)
 1994 : Pas très catholique (dir. Tonie Marshall)
 1994 : Before the Rain (dir. Milcho Manchevski)
 1994 : La Reine Margot (dir. Patrice Chéreau)
 1995 : Fiesta (dir. Pierre Boutron)
 1996 : Le Fils de Gascogne (dir. Pascal Aubier)
 1996 : Nénette et Boni (dir. Claire Denis)
 1998 : La Vie rêvée des anges, (dir. Erick Zonca)
 1998 : Top Secret (dir. Jacques Rivette)
 1999 : Beau Travail (dir. Claire Denis)
 2000 : Sade (dir. Benoît Jacquot)
 2002 : Sex Is Comedy (dir. Catherine Breillat)
 2003 : Snowboarder (dir. Olias Barco)
 2004 : L'intrus (dir. Claire Denis)
 2005 : The Lost Domain (film) (dir. Raúl Ruiz)
 2005 : La Ravisseuse (dir. Antoine Santana)
 2006 : Exes (dir. Martin Cognito)
 2007 : Le Tueur (dir. Cédric Anger)
 2007 : In the Arms of My Enemy (dir. Micha Wald)
 2008 : 35 rhums (dir. Claire Denis)
 2008 : Nanayomachi (dir. Naomi Kawase)
 2010 : Nos résistances (dir. Romain Cogitore)
 2013: Les salauds (dir. Claire Denis)
 2015: Full Contact
 2020: Simple Passion
 2021: You Resemble Me (dir. Dina Amer)
 2022: Both Sides of the Blade (dir. Claire Denis)
 2022: Paris Memories (Revoir Paris)
 2022: Women at War (Les Combattantes)

As director
 2010 : La Baie du renard (short film)

References

External links
 

1975 births
Living people
Expatriate male actors in Argentina
French male child actors
French male stage actors
French male film actors
People from Châtenay-Malabry
20th-century French male actors
21st-century French male actors
French film directors
French male screenwriters
French screenwriters